is a Japanese fantasy light novel series written by Quantum and illustrated by Hana Amano. It was serialized online from January to February 2017 on Kadokawa's user-generated novel publishing website Kakuyomu. It was later published by Fujimi Shobo with three volumes from December 2017 to October 2018 under their Kadokawa Books imprint. A manga adaptation with art by Nori Kazato has been serialized online via Kadokawa Shoten's Young Ace Up website since May 2018 and has been collected in six tankōbon volumes. Both the light novel and manga are licensed in North America by Kadokawa, with Yen Press handling the manga's physical release. An anime television series adaptation produced by EMT Squared aired from April to June 2022.

Plot
In a medieval yet futuristic time, the Demon Queen Echidna and her forces have come from a polluted wasteland called Demon World. The world's strongest hero, Leo Demonheart, has defeated Echidna and her Elite Four. Sometime later, Leo shows up wanting to help Echidna rebuild her army because the human populace became fearful of him instead of celebrating his victory as some people worried that he would become the next demon king. As a result of his exile, Leo wants to help Echidna, but she violently rejects his offer. The Elite Four go behind her back by having Leo help rebuild Echidna's army anyway. He also learns that Echidna wants to obtain the Philosopher's Stone so that she can make the Demon World fertile again.

Leon's flashbacks reveal that the story is in the 51st century; technology and knowledge were lost due to the previous Demon Lord invading Earth in the 21st century and causing World War III. With the loss of machinery, humans adapted to the magic of demons. He himself was one of the experiments and has been programmed to be a hero, but after countless victories and being unable to die or lose, he desires to be free of his painful life.

Characters

He started out as the world's strongest hero who defeated Echidna. Leo is actually 3000 years old because of an experiment done by the scientists of Tokyo as part of their Demonheart experiment, and is the only member involved that didn't die in battle. Because of a rumor that he might become the new demon king, people became fearful of Leo and he was exiled by the human king; aggravated by their scorning of his good will, Leo decided humans don't deserve to exist. It didn't help that his Hero party were incompetent and made Leo abandon them to take care of his job himself. This caused him to side with Echidna's forces, only to be rejected by her. To get into Echidna's army, Leo takes on a disguise and the alias of Black Knight Onyx and convinces the Elite Four to help him without Echidna knowing. Once Echidna learns the truth and he is freed from his programming after finally losing at the hands of his friends, he officially becomes a member of Echidna's army and may have developed feelings for Echidna (although whether this is true or not is unconfirmed).

The Demon Queen with long pink hair and black horns who is the daughter of Cychreus. Echidna came from the Demon World to obtain the Philosopher's Stone, hoping it would make the Demon World habitable, only to be defeated by Leo Demonheart. While Echidna does not want Leo to join up with her, the Elite Four go behind her back by having Leo work to rebuild Echidna's army in secret. For an unknown reason, Echidna didn't have her soldiers kill the humans which led to her defeat. Once Leo is freed from his programing as a hero, she finally accepts him as a member of her army and may possibly have feelings for him.

A magic-using succubus who is the servant of Echidna and member of the Elite Four; she has no combat utility outside of that. She is embarrassed by her race's stereotype, which Leon points out; instead, she is refined and cares more about her subordinates.

The barefoot and animalistic servant of Echidna and the smallest member of the Elite Four. Lili is unfortunately mentally unfit for the job, as all her mission reports look like something a grade schooler would do for homework; though she has a big heart, wanting everyone to enjoy their lives. As a demi-beastperson, Lili sports wolf-like ears, a wolf-like tail, and commands the beastpeople in Echidna's army. Her kind has the law that that if someone of the opposite sex beats them in battle, they are meant to be their mate; hence why she wants to marry Leo so badly. Lili also has the ability to transform into a Fenrir.

A teenaged servant of Echidna and member of the Elite Four. He is a human/demon hybrid who hides part of his face under the hood part of his cowl. At a young age, Melnes was sold into child slavery which led to him siding with Echidna's forces. To learn how to interact with people, due to being so taciturn, Melnes goes undercover as a waitress (due to androgynous looks) at the local tavern.

A dragon-like servant of Echidna and member of the Elite Four. He is responsible for gathering the dragon race to Echidna's side. He's a meathead, who constantly fails at seppuku over the slightest mistake.

A servant of Echidna and her forces.

The daughter of Edwald. She loves her father, but is exasperated with his personality.

Media

Light novels
The series is written by Quantum and illustrated by Hana Amano. Originally serialized online on Kakuyomu from January 12 to February 7, 2017, Fujimi Shobo published the series in three printed volumes under their Kadokawa Books imprint from December 10, 2017, to October 10, 2018. The three volumes were later reprinted by the Fujimi Fantasia Bunko imprint from February 19 to April 20, 2022. An English digital release is being published by Kadokawa on its BookWalker website.

Manga
A manga adaptation with art by Nori Kazato began serialization on Kadokawa Shoten's Young Ace Up website on May 31, 2018. Six tankōbon volumes have been released as of April 2022. The manga is published in English digitally by Kadokawa on its BookWalker website, and in print by Yen Press.

Anime
An anime television series adaptation was announced on October 20, 2021. The series is animated by EMT Squared and directed by Hisashi Ishii, with Yuu Nobuta serving as chief director, Shigeru Murakoshi overseeing the series' scripts, Yuki Nakano designing the characters, and Kōhei Munemoto composing the music. It aired from April 5 to June 21, 2022, on AT-X, Tokyo MX, BS11, and MBS. The opening theme song is "Broken Identity" by Minori Suzuki, while the ending theme song is "Growing" by Nao Tōyama. Sentai Filmworks has licensed the series outside of Asia. Medialink has licensed the series in Southeast Asia, South Asia, and Oceania minus Australia and New Zealand. A two-part original video animation was released with the series' Blu-ray/DVD volumes on June 24 and August 24, 2022.

Episode list

Notes

References

External links
  at Kakuyomu 
  
  
  
  
 

2022 anime television series debuts
2017 Japanese novels
Anime and manga based on light novels
EMT Squared
Fujimi Fantasia Bunko
Fujimi Shobo
Japanese webcomics
Kadokawa Dwango franchises
Kadokawa Shoten manga
Light novels
Light novels first published online
Seinen manga
Sentai Filmworks
Webcomics in print
Yen Press titles